WUFT-FM is an NPR member radio station owned by the University of Florida in Gainesville, Florida, broadcasting news and public media programming from NPR along with other distributors including APM, PRX, WNYC Studios and the BBC. The station also operates a full-time satellite, WJUF in Inverness at 90.1 FM.

History
UF has been involved in broadcasting for almost nine decades. It owns WRUF (850 AM and 103.7 FM), one of the oldest radio stations in the state. Sister television station WUFT-TV is Florida's third oldest public television station. Despite this pioneering role, UF was a relative latecomer to public radio. WUFT-FM did not sign on until September 27, 1981, bringing NPR programming to one of the few areas of the state still without any public radio at all. For most of its history, WUFT-FM aired a mix of classical music and NPR news programming. On August 3, 2009, WUFT-FM's programming was switched to mostly news and public affairs, while classical music was moved to WUFT-FM's HD2 digital subchannel.

WJUF signed on in 1995 as a full-time repeater of WUFT-FM. For years, it was known as Nature Coast 90, but in 2010 re-branded as Florida's 89.1 along with its parent station. In August 2018, the station was rebranded once again to WUFT 89.1/90.1 to reflect the WJUF frequency.

WUFT-FM broadcasts with 100,000 watts of effective radiated power and reaches the following counties in north-central Florida: Alachua, Union, Bradford, Gilchrist, Levy, Marion, Putnam, Clay, Columbia, Lafayette and Dixie. WJUF broadcasts with 20,000 watts of effective radiated power and reaches Sumter, Hernando, Citrus and Pasco counties. WUFT-FM can also be received in nearby St. Johns County and even as far north as Duval County.

WUFT-FM broadcasts one live weekly call-in show: Animal Airwaves - Live, hosted by Dana Hill, who interviews veterinarians from the University of Florida College of Veterinary Medicine. Previous talk programs include Connor Calling with Hank Connor (who retired) and Sikorski's Attic, hosted by antique expert John Sikorski, who answered listeners' questions about antiques and vintage collectibles. WUFT formerly had two locally produced weekly music programs, as well: the soul/R&B-focused Soul Circuit with Margi Hatch on Saturday nights and the classical music-focused Encore! with Dana Hill on Sunday nights.

HD Radio
WUFT-FM also broadcasts in HD. WUFT-FM HD1 (89.1-HD1) simulcasts the analog signal.

WUFT-FM HD2
WUFT-FM broadcasts a classical music format on its 89.1 HD2 channel called WUFT Classic. Programming includes syndicated concerts, the Met's Saturday matinee broadcasts and a locally-produced weekday afternoon program called Magnum Opus, hosted by Dana Hill, which features works with extended running times, from complete symphonies to oratorios. WUFT Classic also includes late-night jazz on Friday and Saturday nights from PRI. Besides being available on 89.1 HD2, WUFT Classic is also broadcast in Gainesville proper on a low-power FM translator, W274BT at 102.7 FM and on WJUF's second digital sub-channel at 90.1 HD2, as well as WUFQ at 88.5 FM in Cross City.

WUFT-FM HD3
WUFT-FM broadcasts a student-run Top 40 music format on its 89.1 HD3 channel called GHQ, which also broadcasts in Gainesville proper on a low-power FM translator, W237EJ at 95.3 FM. However, this station is not available on WJUF. Previously, the HD3 sub-channel broadcast a Latin Top 40 music Spanish language format called "Ritmo Latino". Before that, it aired "WUFT Ahora" with Spanish language news programming from Radio Netherlands Worldwide. In addition to regular music, the station airs specialty shows on weekends, ranging from Latin and hip-hop to EDM.

Newscasts 
WUFT presents weekday hourly news updates produced and anchored by broadcasting students at the University of Florida's College of Journalism and Communications. Additional local newscasts can be heard during NPR's Morning Edition (hosted locally by Glenn Richards) and All Things Considered (hosted locally by Dana Hill).

News staff 
The newsroom (a.k.a. U.F. Innovation News Center) is managed by:
 Mira Lowe - Director
 Forrest Smith - Deputy News Director, Mornings
 Gary W. Green - Deputy News Editor and Digital Director
 Ethan Magoc - Real-Time News Editor
 Ryan Vasquez - Multimedia News Manager
 Harrison Hove - Multimedia News Manager
 Dania Alexandrino - Spanish-language News Manager

External links 
WUFT website
Sikorski's Attic website

UFT-FM
NPR member stations
Radio stations established in 1981
1981 establishments in Florida
News and talk radio stations in the United States